The Midnight Lady is a 1932 American pre-Code crime film directed by Richard Thorpe and starring Sarah Padden, John Darrow and Claudia Dell. It is also known by the alternative title of Dream Mother.

Cast
 Sarah Padden as Nita St. George  
 John Darrow as Bert  
 Claudia Dell as Jean Austin  
 Theodore von Eltz as Byron Crosby  
 Montagu Love as Harvey Austin  
 Lucy Beaumont as Grandma Austin  
 Lina Basquette as Mona Sebastian  
 Donald Keith as Don Austin  
 Brandon Hurst as District Attorney  
 Wayne Lamont as Tony

References

Bibliography
 Pitts, Michael R. Poverty Row Studios, 1929-1940. McFarland & Company, 2005.

External links
 

1932 films
1932 crime films
1930s English-language films
American crime films
Films directed by Richard Thorpe
American black-and-white films
Chesterfield Pictures films
1930s American films